Harry K. Shigeta (1877–1963) was a Japanese–American photographer. He was active in the Little Tokyo, Los Angeles Lakers art scene in the 1920s. He moved to Chicago in 1924.

In Los Angeles, he was a teacher of Tōyō Miyatake.

References

Bibliography 

American photographers
1877 births
1963 deaths
Japanese emigrants to the United States